The Venisami (Gaulish: *Uenisamoi) or Venisamores were a Gallic tribe dwelling in the Alps during the Iron Age.

Name 
They are mentioned as Venisamorum on the Arch of Susa.

The ethnic name Venisami is a latinized form of Gaulish *Uenisamoi (sing. Uenisamos). It can be derived from the stem ueni- ('family, clan, friends') attached to -sāmo- ('calm'), and translated as the 'friendly ones'. It is comparable with the personal names Uenisamus (in Cisalpina) and Uenixama (in Lepontia).

Geography 
They may have dwelled around Forum Germanici (modern Busca), south of the Binbelli, north of the Epanterii, and east of the Statielli.

History 
They appear on the Arch of Susa, erected by Cottius in 9–8 BC.

References

Bibliography 

Historical Celtic peoples
Gauls
Tribes of pre-Roman Gaul
Ancient peoples of Italy